William James Schrader (May 14, 1910 – October 1968) was an American professional basketball player. He played college basketball at the University of Notre Dame, and played in the National Basketball League for the Indianapolis Kautskys for eight games during the 1937–38 season. He married Rosemary Louise Carey on November 10, 1937, and had at least one daughter, Julia (born c. 1939). He died in October 1968.

References

1910 births
1968 deaths
American men's basketball players
Basketball players from Indiana
Centers (basketball)
Indianapolis Kautskys players
Notre Dame Fighting Irish men's basketball players
Sportspeople from Lafayette, Indiana